Ilyinsky is a rural locality (a village) in Udelno-Duvaneysky Selsoviet, Blagoveshchensky District, Bashkortostan, Russia. The population was 5 as of 2010. There are 4 streets.

Geography 
Ilyinsky is located on the Belaya River, 24 km northwest of Blagoveshchensk (the district's administrative centre) by road. Yablochny is the nearest rural locality.

References 

Rural localities in Blagoveshchensky District